Thangavelu is a given name and surname. Notable people with the name include:

 K. A. Thangavelu (1917–1994), Tamil film comedian
 S. Thangavelu (born 1954), Indian politician and the current Member of Parliament in the Raiya Sabha
 Thangavelu Asokan, Indian engineer
 Mariyappan Thangavelu (born 1995), Indian Paralympic high jumper

See also
 Thangavel